Neobuthus is a genus of scorpion of the family Buthidae. It is distributed across the Horn of Africa; in Eritrea, Ethiopia, Somaliland, Kenya and Djibouti.

Taxonomy 
First described by Hirst in 1911, the genus was redefined in 2012 in reviews by Kovařík and Lowe. With its difference from the genus Butheolus settled, it remained a poorly understood taxon due to lack of materials, with several isolated specimens acquired in 2010–2011 provisionally categorized as Neobuthus ferrugineus. Further expeditions to Somaliland, Kenya and Djibouti carried out in the following years allowed for the scope of the genus to be studied with more depth, with seven new species being confirmed in 2018. Neobuthus sudanensis, having a poor original description and still unexamined female specimen, is still unclear as an independent species.

Species 

 Neobuthus amoudensis Kovařík & Lowe, 2018
 Neobuthus awashensis Kovařík & Lowe, 2012
 Neobuthus berberensis Hirst, 1911
 Neobuthus cloudsleythompsoni Lourenço, 2001
 Neobuthus erigavoensis Kovařík & Lowe, 2018
 Neobuthus eritreaensis Kovařík & Lowe, 2016
 Neobuthus factorio Kovařík & Lowe, 2018
 Neobuthus ferrugineus Kraepelin, 1898
 Neobuthus gubanensis Kovařík & Lowe, 2018
 Neobuthus haeckeli Kovařík, 2019
 Neobuthus kloppersi Kovařík & Lowe, 2018
 Neobuthus kutcheri Lowe & Kovařík, 2016
 Neobuthus maidensis Kovařík & Lowe, 2018
 Neobuthus montanus Kovařík & Lowe, 2018
 Neobuthus solegladi Kovařík, 2019
 Neobuthus sudanensis Lourenço, 2005

References

External links 

 

Buthidae
Scorpions of Africa